Julie Dowling may refer to:

 Julie Dowling (artist) (born 1969), Indigenous Australian artist
 Julie Dowling (athlete) (born 1959), Australian Paralympian